The Camballin Irrigation Scheme consisted of the Fitzroy River Barrage, the Seventeen Mile Dam, Company Pump, numerous irrigation channels, a seventeen kilometre levee bank, silos for grain storage which were built at the Broome Jetty and other support infrastructure located at the Camballin townsite.

The scheme was implemented to provide a large scale rice growing venture. Fodder crops, Sorghum, oats and cotton were also trialled.

The scheme was plagued by problems associated with flooding which damaged infrastructure and crops and was abandoned in 1983.

External links
Parliamentary discussions
Camballin Irrigation Area - A summary of Cropping and Pasture Studies 1958-1970

History of Western Australia
Buildings and structures in Western Australia
Kimberley (Western Australia)
Water supply and sanitation in Western Australia
Irrigation in Australia